Walter Buchgraber (21 November 1938 – December 1992) was an Austrian sprint canoeist who competed in the early 1960s. At the 1960 Summer Olympics in Rome, he was eliminated in the repechages of the K-1 4 × 500 m event.

References
Walter Buchgraber's profile at Sports Reference.com

1938 births
1992 deaths
Austrian male canoeists
Canoeists at the 1960 Summer Olympics
Olympic canoeists of Austria